Augustin Bernal Community Park is a  park in the hills southwest of Pleasanton, California.

The park was donated to the city in 1971 by Walter S. Johnson, and connects to Pleasanton Ridge Regional Park. The park is named for the Spanish settler Augustin Bernal, to whom the land on which the park sits was originally granted.

Access to the park's public staging area is through a gated community, Golden Eagle Farms.  Pleasanton residents can show proof of residency to get past the community's gate at Golden Eagle Way and Foothill Road; non-residents can obtain a one-week permit at Pleasanton's Department of Parks and Community Services. The Community Services office is at 200 Old Bernal Ave. in Pleasanton.

Notes

References

External links
Pleasanton Weekly.com: "Augustin Bernal Park hike, what a view"

Parks in Alameda County, California
Geography of Pleasanton, California
Amador Valley
Municipal parks in California